This is a list of primary and secondary characters from Pororo the Little Penguin.

Main characters
The narrator throughout the series is voiced by Goo Ja-hyeong (Korean).

Season 1
 Pororo (voiced in Korean by Lee Seon), the titular character, is a little penguin. In season 1-2, he wears a tan-colored aviator cap, parodying the fact that penguins cannot fly. Pororo often gets into various types of mischief with his friends, which includes trying to fly and playing practical jokes. He resides in a pine-tree house along with Crong, his dinosaur friend and roommate. In season 3 onwards, Pororo wears a blue aviator jumpsuit, a yellow racing helmet with a "P" on top, gold-colored gloves and an orange bandana. Pororo has a crush on Petty. However, Loopy admires Pororo and has a crush on him, to which he never shared his feelings back. Petty is his Dance Festival partner, with their dance "Freeze in your Position" (Pororo Sing-Along).
 Crong (voiced in Korean by Lee Mi-ja) is a little green dinosaur that lives with Pororo. Crong is discovered one day as an egg, which hatches later and is adopted by Pororo as his younger brother. He was 3 years old (currently 5 as of the 4th season). Crong is usually with Pororo and is constantly getting into trouble. He does not speak and can only say his own name to communicate, but is seen speaking beyond his vocabulary in the second season. From season 3 onward, Crong wears a light blue aviator jumpsuit, red bandana, and matching gloves. His instrument is the trumpet.
 Eddy (voiced in Korean by Ham Soo-jeong) is a little orange fox who is an intelligent, inventive genius. He has a crush on Loopy and also on Petty. His inventions include robots, trains, cars, flying devices, ships and submersibles, among other things. These inventions sometimes go horribly wrong, which cause problems for everyone who get caught up in his antics. Eddy resides in a giant hollowed-out tree stump. In season 3 onwards, he wears a white shirt and blue overalls. His instrument is the xylophone.
 Poby (voiced in Korean by Kim Hwan-jin) is a polar bear – with a big black nose and beady eyes – that lives out by a glacier. Poby is also the oldest resident of the Porong Porong Forest. He is the largest of all the characters and has a very gentle nature. He enjoys fishing and photography. In season 2, Poby wears blue overalls. In season 3 onwards, Poby wears a white and light blue shirt and navy blue pants. Poby likes playing the drums.
 Loopy (voiced in Korean by Hong So-yeong) is a pink beaver. Loopy is very shy and sensitive. Loopy lives in a hollowed-out log and often invites visitors over. She is fond of baking cakes and pies for everyone. In the second season, Loopy wears a simplistic hair clip. She wears a pink sailor dress and a flower barrette in season 3 onwards. She can be quite hostile sometimes. She has a crush on Pororo and in the third season, it's to the point she made up a tale where Pororo will marry her, but the marriage declines because Pororo wants to marry Petty, instead. Her instrument is a white piano.

Season 2
 Petty (voiced in Korean by Chung Misook) is a little, blue female penguin; she resembles Pororo in design. Petty wears a violet hood and cap. She is shown to be a little tomboyish, but she has a fear of spiders. She is also a bad cook, mainly her best in playing sports. She lives in a cabin which her friends (mainly Eddy) tried hard to build. In season 3 onwards, Petty wears a purple winter dress and a matching hairband. Her instrument is the classical violin.
 Harry (voiced in Korean by Kim Seo-yeong) is a ruby-colored hummingbird that lost his way from Summer Island and landed into Porong Porong forest. Harry lives in a tiny cabin inside of Poby's house and wears a big purple bowtie. He is warm-hearted and likes to sing joyful, happy songs. He is sometimes very arrogant to the other characters and unable to control his temper – otherwise, Harry mingles a lot.

Season 3
 Rody is an animalistic, yellow robot built by Eddy. Rody has cat-like ears and a permanent grin. Rody lives with Eddy for some time, but given his tremendous strength and lack of social skills, it becomes impractical for him to continue living there. As a result, Eddy later builds him his own house nearby; a large oval-shaped structure made of thick sheet metal. Loyal and obedient, Rody is often grateful for any kind gestures the gang bestows upon him.
 Tong Tong is an orange, tuxedo-wearing male dragon that invites Pororo and friends in season 3. When startled or frightened by someone or something, he rolls up into a ball. Tong Tong lives far away inside a volcano. He has magical powers which are unleashed by chanting his own name many times, but often his magic backfires and cause problems for Pororo and his friends. He also has the ability to transform into a larger, non-anthropomorphic dragon.
 Popo and Pipi – voiced by Ham Su-jung and Kim Seo-yeong in Korean, respectively – are two twin aliens that are often seen together, their designs resembling both a jellyfish and an octopus. Pipi is purple as Popo is blue, each having a green face and green tentacles. They live in a big flying saucer. They moved in from Planet Pipo.

Season 4
 Tu Tu (voiced in Korean by Jang Eun-sook) is a red car who can drive the friends around the village of Porong Porong Forest. Tu Tu appears in some episodes. When Tu Tu gets no fuel, Tu Tu stays in the sun to get more fuel. Tu Tu can be playful sometimes. From the last episode of Season 4 onwards, Tu Tu starts to live with Tong Tong in his house.

Secondary characters
The fish
The robot
The dragon is a friendly green dragon who lives in Porong Porong Forest. Dragon did not appear in Season 3 in favor of Tong Tong.
Steggo is a metal stegosaurus. Steggo does not appear later, in season 3.
The shark is an unfriendly shark who swims in the water of Porong Porong Forest. It is seen chasing Pororo in each opening title of Season 3.
The aliens are a duo of blue unnamed extraterrestrials, who live on the moon and sometimes fly down to Earth in their flying saucer ship. They did not appear in season 3 in favor of Pipi and Popo.
Nyao is a brown stuffed cat who lives with Tong Tong in season 3. Nyao often causes trouble and is very naughty, being able to transform into a large cat. Whenever the gang come to visit Tong Tong, Nyao would fall in love with Petty. Nyao wears a red cap.
The Snow Monster is a yeti who has white fur and a light brown face, appearing in season 4.

Pororo the Little Penguin